Kyiv confectionery factory "Roshen", formerly known as the Karl Marx Kyiv Confectionery Factory is the largest confectionery company in Kyiv, Ukraine, and the most important subdivision of the Roshen Confectionery Corporation.

History

The factory was founded in 1874 by Valentin Yefimov. In 1923, it was named after Karl Marx by the Soviet authorities in order to celebrate his 105th anniversary. Petro Poroshenko acquired control over the factory soon after its privatization in the 1990s, making it the basis for the future Roshen Corporation; a major modernization with Western equipment followed.

It is unclear when exactly Roshen decided to officially rename the factory, dropping the "Karl Marx" part.

The project to revitalize part of the Roshen factory won a bronze medal at the prestigious International Design Awards (IDA).

Products
The factory produces more than 100 different products of confectionery, including a variety of chocolate bars, candies, cakes, cookies, and fruit jellies. Among the factory's best-known brands are: "Kyiv cake"; "Kyiv Vechirniy" chocolate and nut candies; "Chaika", "Teatralnyi" and "Alionka" plain chocolate bars and other products.

References

External links
 Kyiv Confectionery Factory Factory's page on Roshen Corporation website

Ukrainian chocolate companies
Confectionery companies of Ukraine
Food and drink companies of the Soviet Union
Manufacturing companies based in Kyiv
Companies established in 1874
1874 establishments in the Russian Empire
Companies nationalised by the Soviet Union